Lars Burgsmüller was the defending champion but lost in the second round to Olivier Rochus.

Karol Kučera won in the final 7–6(7–4) , 6–4 against Rochus.

Seeds
A champion seed is indicated in bold text while text in italics indicates the round in which that seed was eliminated.

  Jarkko Nieminen (first round)
  Wayne Arthurs (semifinals)
  Karol Kučera (champion)
  Radek Štěpánek (semifinals)
  Kenneth Carlsen (first round)
  Martin Verkerk (first round)
  Mario Ančić (first round)
  Raemon Sluiter (first round)

Draw

External links
 2003 Copenhagen Open draw

2003 Copenhagen Open - 1
2003 ATP Tour